Hammer and Anvil may refer to:

 Hammer and anvil military tactics
 Taskforces Hammer and Anvil of the 2002 Operation Anaconda in the NATO-Afghanistan War
 Hammer and Anvil (album), 2010 album by Pure Reason Revolution
 Hammer and Anvil (comics), Marvel Comics supervillain pair

See also

 Blacksmithing, the use of the hammer and anvil
 Hammer, anvil and stirrup, bones of the ear
 "Hammer into Anvil" (episode) 1967 TV episode of The Prisoner
 "The Anvil or the Hammer" (episode) 2015 TV episode of Gotham
 Hammers Over the Anvil (film), 1993 Australian biopic
 "Between the Hammer and the Anvil" (song), 1990 Judas Priest song
 
 
 Hammer (disambiguation)
 Anvil (disambiguation)
 Arm and hammer (disambiguation)
 Hammer and sickle (disambiguation)